The discography of Example, a British singer, consists of seven studio albums, forty-two singles and 53 music videos. As of March 2014, Example has achieved fifteen top forty singles on the UK Singles Chart, including two number-one singles; "Changed the Way You Kiss Me" and "Stay Awake".

Example released his debut studio album What We Made in 2007. It peaked at number 125 in the UK Albums Chart. His second studio album, Won't Go Quietly, was released three years later. It peaked at number four of the same chart and was certified as Gold by the British Phonographic Industry (BPI). Five singles were released from it, and were mild-received in diverse world charts. The next year, Example released Playing in the Shadows, which topped the UK Albums Chart, and included the singles "Changed the Way You Kiss Me" and "Stay Awake", among others. In 2012, The Evolution of Man was released on 19 November. It peaked at the thirteenth spot, and has been certified Gold by the BPI.

In March 2014, Example revealed the name of his 5th studio album to be Live Life Living and the artwork of the standard and deluxe editions, which have been loosely based on his live Ibiza shows by MTV. It includes already released single "All the Wrong Places" which was released on 6 September 2013, the second single "Kids Again" which was released on 14 March 2014 and the third single "One More Day (Stay with Me)" which was released on 20 June 2014. The fourth single is "10 Million People" and was released on 3 October 2014.

Albums

Studio albums

Remix albums

Mixtapes

Compilation albums

Singles

As lead artist

As featured artist

Other charted songs

Other appearances

Additional appearances
"Plastic Smile" (with Felguk) – featured as the B-side track of Felguk's "Jack It" EP, as a bonus track in the iTunes version of Playing in the Shadows and in the 2012 video game SSX.

Songwriting credits

Music videos

Notes

References

External links

Discographies of British artists